Spermophagus drak is a beetle species from the Chrysomelidae family. The scientific name of this species was first published in 1991 by Borowiec.

References

Bruchinae
Beetles described in 1991